Henry William Menard (December 10, 1920 – February 9, 1986) was an American geologist.

Life and career
He earned a B.S. and M.S. from the California Institute of Technology in 1942 and 1947, having served in the South Pacific during World War II as a photo interpreter. In 1949, he completed a Ph.D. in marine geology at Harvard University. Menard is perhaps best known for his promotion of the theory of plate tectonics before it was widely accepted in the scientific community. Menard served many roles during his career as a marine geologist. Field worker, theorist, educator, popularizer, entrepreneur and statesman.

Menard's historical and sociological writings are respected by historians of science. Menard began his professional career in 1949, in the Sea Floor Studies Section of San Diego's Navy Electronics Laboratory. He joined the Scripps Institution of Oceanography (SIO) in 1955 as associate professor of geology.  Menard's field work was extensive, involving 1,000 aqua-lung dives and 20 oceanographic expeditions from 1949 until 1978 when he became Director of the U.S.G.S. His research focused on the morphology of the ocean floor. During the 1950s, Menard also started a scuba-diving business with a few colleagues that included consulting for AT&T on the laying of cable.

He became a full professor of the University of California, San Diego in 1961. Two years were spent at 
Churchill College (1962 and 1970–71). Following a year in Washington, D.C. as technical advisor in the Office of Science and Technology (1965–66), Menard served as Director of the University of California's Institute of Marine Resources.

USGS career
In April 1978, H. William Menard became the United States Geological Survey's tenth Director but remained only through the balance of the Carter administration. Menard had been a marine geologist with the Naval Electronics Laboratory in San Diego for several years and then had become a member of the faculty of the Scripps Institution of Oceanography. In 1965-66, he was associated with the Office of Science and Technology in the White House. A member of the National Academy of Sciences, Menard was a recognized worldwide authority in marine geology and oceanography and had discovered notable topographic and structural features of the sea floor that laid much of the foundation of the plate-tectonics revolution in geology.

After his return to the Scripps Institution of Oceanography in 1981, Menard continued to teach, write, and do research. Menard died from cancer on February 9, 1986. A biographical memoir was published by the National Academy of Sciences in 1994.

Awards and honors
 1968 - elected to the National Academy of Sciences
 1985 - William Bowie Award from the American Geophysical Union

Publications
 "Marine Geology of the Pacific", 1964
 "Anatomy of an Expedition", 1969
 "Science: Growth and Change", 1971 
 "Geology, Resources, and Society", 1974 
 "Ocean Science", 1978 
 "Islands", 1986 
 "The Ocean of Truth: A Personal History of Global Tectonics", 1986

See also
Archipelagic apron

References

External links
 Portrait of William Menard from U.S. Geological Survey Museum Collection
 Photograph of Dr. Henry William Menard from U.S. Geological Survey Photographic Library (Portraits Collection)
 Photograph of Henry William Menard from U.S. Geological Survey History (USGS: The Survey at 100)

20th-century American geologists
1920 births
1986 deaths
California Institute of Technology alumni
United States Geological Survey personnel
Harvard University alumni
People from Fresno, California
American military personnel of World War II
University of California, San Diego faculty
Fellows of Churchill College, Cambridge
American oceanographers
Members of the United States National Academy of Sciences
Marine geologists
Tectonicists
Deaths from cancer in California